Labor Pains may refer to:

 Pain experienced during the process of childbirth
 Labor Pains (film), a 2009 American romantic comedy film
 "Labor Pains" (The Simpsons), an episode of the American animated television series The Simpsons
 "Labor Pains" (Medium), an episode of the American television series Medium